Francis Finch (died 1874) was a British Liberal Party politician. He was the Member of Parliament (MP) for Walsall 1837–1841 .

He died in 1874.

References

External links 

1874 deaths
Liberal Party (UK) MPs for English constituencies
UK MPs 1837–1841
Year of birth missing